John Fass Morton (born March 26, 1947) is an American actor, stuntman and writer. He is known for playing Boba Fett in The Empire Strikes Back, acting as a double to Jeremy Bulloch.

Career
Morton appeared in A Bridge Too Far (1977), in the 1980 hit sequel film Superman II as an astronaut named Nate, and also that year he appeared in Flash Gordon. He was featured in the BBC television series Oppenheimer (1980). He portrayed Dak Ralter, Luke Skywalker's gunner during the Battle of Hoth in The Empire Strikes Back. When Jeremy Bulloch played an Imperial Officer, he needed someone to cover for him as Boba Fett. Being similar in height, Morton was a body double for two days in costume. He filmed with another unit, the sequence when Fett confronts Darth Vader in the Bespin hallway during Han Solo's torture, while Bulloch filmed his scenes as the Imperial Officer. Afterwards, he left Hollywood and eventually settled in public relations work back in Annapolis. He is also an accomplished musician (guitar player) and a writer (Backstory in Blue, 2008).

Personal life
Morton is married to Gail, and has attended several Star Wars conventions throughout the world since 1997.

Filmography

Film

References

External links
 
 John Fass Morton WorldCat
 John Morton BFI

1947 births
Living people
Male actors from Maryland
People from Annapolis, Maryland